Jamaat Shaim is a town in Safi Province, Marrakesh-Safi, Morocco. According to the 2004 census it had a population of 15,325.

References

Populated places in Safi Province
Municipalities of Morocco